Prime Minister Bisher Al-Khasawneh's was tasked with forming a cabinet on 7 October 2020. He was sworn in along with his cabinet on 12 October 2020. The two exceptions were Minister of State Mahmoud Kharabsheh who had been tested positive for COVID-19, and Minister of State for Follow-up and Government Coordination Nawaf Wasfi Tell who had to follow quarantine requirements after return from abroad.

Cabinet Members 
The current Cabinet of Prime Minister and Minister of Defence Bisher Al-Khasawneh include the following members:

 Tawfiq Kreishan as Deputy Prime Minister and Minister of Local Administration
 Ayman Safadi as Deputy Prime Minister and Minister of Foreign Affairs and Expatriates
 Khaled Musa Al Henefat as Minister of Agriculture
 Azmi Mahafzah as Minister of Education and Higher Education and Scientific Research
 Wajih Azaizeh as Minister of Political and Parliamentary Affairs
 Faisal Shboul as Minister of Government Communications
 Nasser Shraideh as Deputy Prime Minister for Economic Affairs and Minister of State for Public Sector Modernisation
 Ahmad Maher Abul Samen as Minister of Public Works and Housing and Minister of Transport
 Nayef Al Fayez as Minister of Tourism and Antiquities
 Ibrahim Jazi as Minister of State for Prime Ministry Affairs
 Nancy Namrouqa as Minister of State for Legal Affairs
 Ahmad Nouri Ziadat as Minister of Justice
 Yousef Shamali as Minister of Industry, Trade, and Supply and Minister of Labour
 Dr. Saleh A. Al-Kharabsheh as Minister of Energy and Mineral Resources
 Mohamad Al Ississ as Minister of Finance
 Mohammad Khalayleh as Minister of Awqaf and Islamic Affairs
 Haifa Najjar as Minister of Culture
 Muawieh Radaideh as Minister of Environment
 Wafaa Bani Mustafa as Minister of Social Development
 Mazin Abdellah Hilal Al Farrayeh as Minister of Interior
 Firas Al-Hawari as Minister of Health
 Mohammed Al Najjar as Minister of Water and Irrigation
 Mohammad Salameh Al Nabulsi as Minister of Youth
 Ahmad Hanandeh as Minister of Digital Economy and Entrepreneurship
 Kholoud Saqqaf as Minister of Investment
 Zeina Toukan as Minister of Planning and International Cooperation

References 

Cabinets established in 2020
Cabinet of Jordan
Current governments
2020 establishments in Jordan